Breezin' is the fifteenth studio album by jazz/soul guitarist and vocalist George Benson.  It is his debut on Warner Bros. Records.  It not only was a chart-topper in the Jazz category but also went to #1 on the pop and R&B charts. It was certified triple platinum, making it one of the best-selling jazz albums of all time.

Commercial performance 
Breezin''' marked the beginning of Benson's most successful period commercially, topping the Billboard Pop, Jazz and R&B album charts.  It spun off two hit singles, the title song (which has become a fusion jazz standard) and "This Masquerade," which was a top ten pop and R&B hit. The album has since been certified as 3X multi-Platinum by the RIAA.

The album garnered multiple nominations and awards at the 19th Annual Grammy Awards. The album won the awards Best Pop Instrumental Performance for Benson and Best Engineered Album, Non-Classical for Al Schmitt and was nominated as Album of the Year for Tommy LiPuma and Benson. "This Masquerade" received the award Record of the Year for LiPuma and Benson, while it was nominated as Song of the Year for Leon Russell and as Best Pop Vocal Performance, Male for Benson.

 Critical reception 

In a contemporaneous review for The Village Voice, music critic Robert Christgau gave the album a "C" and dismissed most of its music as "mush". In a retrospective review, Allmusic's Richard S. Ginell gave it three-and-a-half out of five stars and said that, although Benson's guitar is "as assured and fluid as ever", Breezin'' is "really not so much a breakthrough as it is a transition album; the guitar is still the core of his identity."

Track listing

Personnel 
 George Benson – guitar, vocals
 Jorge Dalto – acoustic piano, clavinet, acoustic piano solo (2)
 Ronnie Foster – electric piano, Minimoog synthesizer, mini-Moog solo (3), electric piano solo (5)
 Phil Upchurch – rhythm guitar, bass (1, 3)
 Stanley Banks – bass (2, 46)
 Harvey Mason – drums
 Ralph MacDonald – percussion
 Claus Ogerman – arrangements and conductor

Production
 Tommy LiPuma – producer
 Noel Newbolt – associate producer
 Al Schmitt – recording, mixing
 Don Henderson – assistant engineer
 Doug Sax – mastering at The Mastering Lab (Hollywood, California).
 Ed Thrasher – art direction
 Robert Lockhart – art direction
 Peter Palombi – design
 Mario Casilli – photography

Charts

Weekly charts

Year-end charts

Certifications and sales

See also
List of number-one albums of 1976 (U.S.)
List of number-one R&B albums of 1976 (U.S.)

References

External links
 George Benson-Breezin at Discogs

 ''Breezin''' at Myspace (streamed copy where licensed)

George Benson albums
1976 albums
Warner Records albums
Albums produced by Tommy LiPuma
Albums arranged by Claus Ogerman
Albums recorded at Capitol Studios
Grammy Award for Best Engineered Album, Non-Classical